is a Japanese light novel series written by Piero Karasu and illustrated by Yuri Kisaragi. It was originally serialized online on the user-generated novel publishing website Shōsetsuka ni Narō between February 2019 and August 2021. It was later acquired by Fujimi Shobo who published the series in print since January 2020 under their Fujimi Fantasia Bunko imprint. A manga adaptation with art by Harutsugu Nadaka has been serialized in ASCII Media Works' Dengeki Maoh since July 2020. Both the light novel and manga are licensed in North America by Yen Press. An anime television series adaptation produced by Diomedéa premiered in January 2023.

Plot
Anisphia, the Princess who remembered her previous life at a young age, as well as her old self's intense love of magic, set off to live out her fantasies in the fantasy world she finds herself in. During a magical mishap, she stumbled upon a scene where her brother Algard was breaking off his engagement to his fiancée, Euphyllia. With Euphyllia stripped of her title as the kingdom's next monarch Anisphia offers for Euphyllia to come live and research magic with her as they plan a way to restore her good name.

Characters

Main
 
 
 The main protagonist and the first princess of the Kingdom of Palettia. She has always loved magic yet, being reincarnated from Earth, cannot use it herself. So to compensate, she turned to science and used her previous life's knowledge to invent all sorts of magical gadgets. She is also an out of closet lesbian. While her eccentricities cause others to see her as a problem child who forced her responsibilities onto her younger brother, Algard, she actually thinks of her country and people more than anyone, ceding the throne out of a genuine belief that she would not be a good ruler. Following a fight with a dragon, she gets afflicted with a curse that is now slowly turning her into a dragon herself.

  / 
 
 A high-ranking noble and the ex-fiancé of Anisphia's younger brother, Algard, after he publicly breaks off their engagement for allegedly bullying Lainie, his genuine love interest. While talented in magic and politics, she initially kept others away with her perfectionist attitude, but slowly opens up after being taken in by Anisphia and even begins developing romantic feelings toward her. She is later adopted into the royal family after completing a Spirit Covenant and becomes eligible for the throne, so it would not be forced onto Anisphia after Algard is disowned. However, the Covenant also turned her into a spirit reliant on magical energy to survive, which she takes from Anisphia through kisses.

 
 
 Anisphia's maid. She has a deep loyalty to her, having been helped by her in the past, and shares a bond with her that is closer to sisterly than master and servant.

 
 
 A commoner-turned-noble and Algard's love interest whom Euphie allegedly bullied, though it was really just a misunderstanding. It is eventually revealed that she is actually a vampire who constantly gives off a charm that makes people infatuated with her, which she herself was unaware of. Following this, she is taken in by Anisphia so she may learn to control her abilities, which she repays by working for her as a maid. However, awakening to her true nature also caused her blood cravings to manifest which Ilia helps alleviate by letting her suck hers, causing her to develop romantic feelings for the latter.

Supporting

A noblewoman who was disowned by her family and Anisphia's best friend. Though born with powerful magic, her body cannot handle it, causing her pain whenever she uses it. This, along with noble society's focus on magic, eventually caused her to snap and lash out against her family, becoming an infamous sadist, until Anisphia stopped her rampage. At present, she has taken to developing drugs and often supports Anisphia in her research. Her past has also led her to develop an obsession with incurable conditions, which she refers to as "curses".

Anisphia's father and the king of the Kingdom of Palettia. While he truly cares for his children, his royal responsibilities force him to put his country first. The stress of ruling has also negatively impacted his health, looking older than he actually is and taking pills for regular stomach aches, which is not helped by his daughter's antics.

Anisphia's mother and the queen of the Kingdom of Palettia. Though youthful in appearance, when she was actually young she was a fearsome warrior who raised her children in her spartan ways, making her the only person Anisphia fears. However, she cares greatly for her children and later mellows out considerably following Algard's failed coup, believing she had failed as a mother.

Euphyllia's father and the prime minister of the Kingdom of Palettia. While he initially had a somewhat strained relationship with his daughter, after her engagement is canceled he realizes that he had impossible expectations of her and apologizes, causing their bond to improve considerably. However, he is later forced to cut her off after she is adopted into the royal family for political reasons.

The ancestor of the royal family of the Kingdom of Palettia. While seemingly around the same age as Anisphia, having completed a Spirit Covenant, she is actually a human-turned-spirit who is close to a thousand years old.

Antagonists

Anisphia's younger brother and the crown prince of the Kingdom of Palettia, as his sister gave up her right to the throne. He is also Euphyllia's ex-fiancé, after he broke off their engagement for allegedly bullying Lainie, his genuine love interest. It is eventually revealed that he has always been jealous of his sister and wanted to one-up her, which drove him to plot a revolution to purge the country's corrupt nobles. In reality, he was using Lainie's vampiric abilities to brainwash nobles and he later steals her powers to become a vampire himself. In the end, while reconciling with Anisphia, he is disowned for his attempted coup d'etat.

Count Chartreuse's son and Algard's friend who supported him in breaking off his engagement with Euphyllia. It is later revealed that he was the only one in Algard's inner circle who was not under Lainie's charm and played an active role in the prince's attempted revolution, causing him to be arrested after the plot is exposed.

The minister of magic who opposes any changes that might endanger the nobles' authority, like Anisphia's inventions. He had been secretly manipulating Algard for years to turn him into a puppet ruler under his control and played an active role in the prince's attempted revolution, unaware that the latter was planning on eventually double-crossing him. In the end, he is executed for treason after the plot is exposed.

Minor

Lainie's father and an adventurer-turned-noble. He met Laine's mother before his ascension, unaware she was a vampire, and later took his illegitimate daughter in after she passed away. He is also an overprotective father, having reservations about his daughter staying with Anisphia after her vampiric nature is revealed but ultimately letting her go.

The head of the Kingdom of Palettia's knight order and an acquaintance of Anisphia. He grew estranged from his son, Navre, after the boy supported Algard in breaking off his engagement to Euphyllia. However, the two began to repair their familial bond after Anisphia discovered that Lainie had accidentally charmed Navre and snapped him out of it.

Matthew's son and Algard's friend who supported him in breaking off his engagement with Euphyllia. It is later revealed, however, that Lainie had accidentally charmed him and he snapped out of it after Anisphia called him out for his actions.

The son of an influential merchant and Algard's friend who supported him in breaking off his engagement with Euphyllia. It is later revealed, however, that Lainie had accidentally charmed him.

Media

Light novels
The series written by Piero Karasu was originally serialized online between February 2019 and August 2021 on the user-generated novel publishing website Shōsetsuka ni Narō. It was later acquired by Fujimi Shobo and published with illustrations by Yuri Kisaragi under their light novel imprint Fujimi Fantasia Bunko, which was announced on October 10, 2019, with the first volume being released on January 18, 2020. The light novel is licensed in North America by Yen Press.

Manga
A manga adaptation with art by Harutsugu Nadaka has been serialized in ASCII Media Works' Dengeki Maoh since July 27, 2020. The manga is also licensed in North America by Yen Press.

Anime
In August 2022, it was announced that the novels would be adapted into an anime television series. It is produced by Diomedéa and directed by Shingo Tamaki, with scripts written by Wataru Watari, character designs handled by Naomi Ide, creature designs by Tsutomu Miyazawa, and music composed by Moe Hyūga. The series premiered on January 4, 2023, on AT-X and other networks. The opening theme song is "Arc-en-Ciel" by Hanatan, while the ending theme song is "Only for You" by Sayaka Senbongi and Manaka Iwami. Crunchyroll licensed the series. Muse Communication has licensed the series in South and Southeast Asia.

Reception
As of January 2022, the series has 180,000 copies in circulation.

The light novel was generally received positive reviews. Anime UK News gave the first volume a 8 out of 10 rating, commenting that "Piero Karasu manages to capture the delicate balance of keeping things light-hearted and also emotional when it needs to be." In Anime News Network's 2022 Spring Light Novel Guide gave it a 3 out of 5 rating, Silverman notes that "Piero Karasu has a nice touch with the girls' attraction to each other that makes the romance really slow and sweet." however she criticises that this is "buried under too many pages of world building and explanation."

For Anime News Network's 2022 Spring Manga Guide, the manga adaption was given a 3 and half out of 5 rating. Silverman notes that while the light novel struggles to find a balance between world-building and plots, as well as havin too many narrative voices that all sound alike, these issues "are largely absent from Harustugu Nadaka's manga version. In part this is simply because the manga format, with its use of speech and thought bubbles, negates the need for the confusing narration found in the book" Erica Friedman, the founder of Yuricon, notes that while the first volume of light novel left them feeling uninspired, the manga was well done enough for her to continue reading the series, "You want to know what the grand experiment is and how Euphyllia can help Anisphia and you cheer for them both as they launch themselves into a grand adventure. [...] now I’m kind of interested in reading more of the manga to see what happens."

Writing for Anime Feminist, Vrai Kaiser praised the anime adaptation for its comedy, characters, and lack of sexualization of its characters, and expressed interest in the series as a new contribution to "genre yuri" such as The Executioner and Her Way of Life and Otherside Picnic.

Notes

References

External links
  at Shōsetsuka ni Narō 
  
  
  
 

2020 Japanese novels
2023 anime television series debuts
Anime and manga based on light novels
ASCII Media Works manga
AT-X (TV network) original programming
Crunchyroll anime
Dengeki Comics
Diomedéa
Fiction about reincarnation
Fujimi Fantasia Bunko
Isekai anime and manga
Isekai novels and light novels
LGBT in anime and manga
Light novels
Light novels first published online
Muse Communication
Seinen manga
Shōsetsuka ni Narō
Yen Press titles
Yuri (genre) anime and manga
Yuri (genre) light novels